The R series is a line of petrol engines introduced by British Leyland in 1983 for the then-new Austin Maestro. It was only produced in one capacity—1.6 litres.

Design
The engine was essentially a lightly modified version of the E-series unit found in the Maxi and Allegro. The main differences over the older engine are to the sump and gearbox mounting flange, which were adapted to accept a traditional "end-on" transmission unit which had been bought from Volkswagen in place of the traditional BMC transmission-in-sump arrangement. It retains the 1.5-liter E-series' bore of  along with a longer  stroke.

Like the E-series, it has a cast iron block and aluminium head. As with the E, the cylinders are siamesed, to fit the biggest bore cylinders possible. The combustion chambers were of Weslake's kidney-shaped design. The carburettor for the regular version was a single-venturi one with an automatic electronic choke, while the MG version received two twin Weber 40 DCNF carburetors and none of the fuel-saving electronics.

Problems
The R series was mainly a stop gap, and had a very short production run that lasted barely two years.  BL had been working on a more substantially revised version of the E series, but this was not ready for production in time for the Maestro's already badly delayed launch. The company was instead forced into launching the Maestro with the half-developed power unit which cost the company dearly—R-series-equipped Maestros soon gained a reputation for hot starting problems, cylinder head gasket failures (endemic to the E series also), and premature crankshaft failure.  Because the E series was turned through 180 degrees in order to accommodate an end-on transmission, the R series was fitted to the Maestro with the carburettor facing the front of the car, which also led to a reputation for carburettor icing in cold weather.

The endemic problem of crankshaft failure was later attributed to flexing of the crankcase – because the E series relied upon the heavy sump/transmission unit to give additional strength to the cylinder block casting, this caused problems when a plain sump was bolted in its place.

The R series was superseded in 1984 by the S series.

References

R series engine
Gasoline engines by model